The stiff-tailed ducks, the genus Oxyura, are part of the Oxyurini tribe of ducks. 

All have, as their name implies, long, stiff tail feathers, which are erected when the bird is resting. All have relatively large, swollen bills.  These are freshwater diving ducks. Their legs are set far back, which makes them awkward on land, so they rarely leave the water.

Their unusual displays involve drumming noises from inflatable throat sacs,  head throwing, and erecting short crests. Plumage sequences are complicated, and aging difficult. Plumage is vital for survival because of this animals tendency to spend time in the water.

Taxonomy
The genus Oxyura  was introduced (as a subgenus) in 1828 by the French naturalist Charles Lucien Bonaparte to accommodate a single taxon, Anas rubidus Wilson, 1814. This is now considered to be a synonym of Anas jamaicensis Gmelin 1789, the ruddy duck. The genus name is derived from Ancient Greek oxus, meaning "sharp", and oura meaning "tail".

The six extant members of this genus are distributed widely throughout North America, South America, Australia]], Asia, and much of Africa.

Species

A fossil species from the Late Pliocene or Early Pleistocene of Jalisco (Mexico) was described as Oxyura zapatanima. It resembled a small ruddy duck or, even more, an Argentine blue-bill. A larger Middle Pleistocene fossil form from the southwestern United States was described as Oxyura bessomi; it was probably quite close to the ruddy duck.

"Oxyura" doksana from the Early Miocene of Dolnice (Czech Republic) cannot be assigned to any anatine subfamily with certainty.

References

Further reading
Worthy, Trevor H.; Tennyson, A.J.D.; Jones, C.; McNamara, J.A. & Douglas, B.J. (2007): Miocene waterfowl and other birds from central Otago, New Zealand. J. Syst. Palaeontol. 5(1): 1-39.  (HTML abstract)

Oxyura
Ducks
Extant Miocene first appearances
Taxa named by Charles Lucien Bonaparte